Great Harwood F.C. was an English football club based in Great Harwood, Lancashire. Their colours were Red and White, latterly represented by an All Red playing kit and they played at the Showground , Wood Street, Great Harwood.

History
Founded in the 1880s Great Harwood joined Division Two of the Lancashire Combination in 1908. After World War I the league was reduced to a single division from which the club was eventually relegated in the summer of 1947 following the re-introduction of Division Two . They were later crowned Lancashire Combination Champions in 1968–69 and subsequently became founder members of the Northern Premier League. At the time the side featured several former Football League players including ex-England internationals Ronnie Clayton and Bryan Douglas, and ex-Welsh international Roy Vernon. In 1970–71 under the management of Tommy Cummings they reached the first round of the FA Cup for the first and only time, losing 6–2 at home to Rotherham United.

In the summer of 1978 financial problems caused the club to fold. Following the demise of the club, Great Harwood Wellington became the town's leading football club as they adopted the name Great Harwood Town and immediately took over tenancy of the Showground.

Honours
Lancashire Combination
Champions 1968–69

Former players
1. Players that have played/managed in the Football League or any foreign equivalent to this level (i.e. fully professional league).
2. Players with full international caps.
3. Players that hold a club record or have captained the club.
 Adam Blacklaw
 Ronnie Clayton
 Alan Cocks
 Bryan Douglas
 Willie Irvine
 Les Latcham 
 Sammy Todd
 Richard Dinnis

References

Defunct football clubs in England
Sport in Hyndburn
West Lancashire Football League
Lancashire Combination
Northern Premier League clubs
Association football clubs disestablished in 1978
Great Harwood
1978 disestablishments in England
Defunct football clubs in Lancashire
Association football clubs established in the 19th century